Halimede is a genus of crabs in the family Galenidae, with species occurring in Australia, Africa, and China.

Species 
 Halimede coppingeri Miers, 1884
 Halimede fragifer (De Haan, 1835)
 Halimede ochtodes (Herbst, 1783)
 Halimede tyche (Herbst, 1801)

References 

Decapod genera
Pilumnoidea